KDAN may refer to:

 KDAN (FM), a radio station (91.5 FM) licensed to serve Marshall, California, United States
 Danville Regional Airport (ICAO code KDAN)